Thalappady is a village in the Kasaragod district of the State of Kerala in India. The Kunjathur Mahalingeshwara temple is located in Thalappady.

Location
Thalappady is the northernmost village in Kerala. While traveling from Kasaragod to Mangalore, Thalappady is the last village in Kerala. It is one kilometre from Kunjathur town. There are check posts of Kerala and Karnataka states in this village. After the check posts, there is another village called Talapady in Karnataka state.

Access
Thalappady is located on the Kerala-Karnataka border. It is 30  km from Kasaragod and one km from Manjeshwaram. The village is 586  km from the state capital Thiruvananthapuram. Mangalore is only 24 km from Manjeshwar.

Post office
Thalappady has a post office and the pin code is 671323.

Administration
Thalappady is part of Manjeshwaram Taluk. It comes under the Manjeshwaram grama panchayath.

Schools
 Udhaya Highschool, Manjeshwar
 Govt VHSS, Kunjathur
 Government High School, Bengra Manjeshwar. 
 Sirajul Hudha School, Manjeshwar.

Transportation
The nearest railway station is Manjeshwar at a distance of 2 km. Thokottu railway station is 14 km away.

References

Manjeshwar area